Lock and Dam No. 5 is a lock and dam located in Buffalo County, Wisconsin and Winona County, Minnesota on the Upper Mississippi River around river mile 738.1. It was constructed and placed in operation May 1935. The site underwent major rehabilitation from 1987 through 1998. The lock and dam are owned and operated by the St. Paul District of the United States Army Corps of Engineers-Mississippi Valley Division.

See also
 Public Works Administration dams list
 Upper Mississippi River National Wildlife and Fish Refuge

References

External links

U.S. Army Corps of Engineers, St. Paul District: Lock and Dam 5
U.S. Army Corps of Engineers, St. Paul District: Lock and Dam 5 brochure

Mississippi River locks
Driftless Area
Buildings and structures in Buffalo County, Wisconsin
Buildings and structures in Winona County, Minnesota
Transportation in Winona County, Minnesota
Dams in Minnesota
Dams in Wisconsin
Historic American Engineering Record in Minnesota
Historic American Engineering Record in Wisconsin
United States Army Corps of Engineers dams
Transport infrastructure completed in 1935
Roller dams
Gravity dams
Dams on the Mississippi River
Mississippi Valley Division
Locks of Minnesota
Locks of Wisconsin